The Cook County, Illinois, general election was held on November 6, 1990.

Primaries were held March 20, 1990.

Elections were held for the offices of Assessor, Clerk, Sheriff, State's Attorney, Cook County Superintendent of Education Service Region, Treasurer, President of the Cook County Board of Commissioners, all 17 seats of the Cook County Board of Commissioners, both seats of the Cook County Board of Appeals, 3 seats on the Water Reclamation District Board, and judgeships on the Circuit Court of Cook County.

Election information
1990 was a midterm election year in the United States. The primaries and general elections for Cook County races coincided with those for federal (Senate and House) and those for state elections.

Voter turnout

Primary election
Turnout in the primaries was 36.93%, with 985,614 ballots cast.

Chicago saw 607,899 ballots cast, and suburban Cook County saw 30.24% turnout (with 377,715 ballots cast).

General election
The general election saw turnout of 52.75%, with 1,408,516 ballots cast. Chicago saw 750,842 ballots cast, and suburban Cook County saw 52.82% turnout (with 657,674 ballots cast).

Straight-ticket voting
Ballots had a straight-ticket voting option in 1990.

Assessor 

In the 1990 Cook County Assessor election, incumbent fourth-term assessor Thomas Hynes, a Democrat, was reelected.

Primaries

Democratic

Republican

General election

Clerk 

In the 1990 Cook County Clerk election, incumbent fourth-term clerk Stanley Kusper, a Democrat, did not seek reelection, instead opting to run for both Cook County Board of Commissioners president and Cook County commissioner. Democrat David Orr was elected to succeed him.

Primaries

Democratic
Chicago alderman David Orr won the Democratic nomination. Sutker, who placed second, had been slated by the Cook County Democratic Party organization as its endorsed candidate in the race.

Republican

General election

Sheriff 

In the 1990 Cook County Sheriff election, incumbent first-term sheriff James E. O'Grady, a Republican, was defeated by Democrat Michael F. Sheahan.

Primaries

Democratic

Republican

Illinois Solidarity

General election
Corruption allegations took a toll on incumbent Republican James E. O'Grady's prospects for reelection. O'Grady ultimately had failed to live up to his 1986 campaign promises of disposing of politics and corruption in the Cook County Sheriff's Office, and had become unpopular among his constituents.

Democratic nominee Michael F. Sheahan defeated O'Grady by a broad margin. O'Grady suffered one of biggest defeats that a Republican Party nominee had experienced in a countywide Cook County election in years. Sheahan had managed to beat O'Grady in 24 of the county's 30 suburban townships and in every ward of Chicago. Sheahan had even managed to carry many of the county's Republican strongholds. Within the city of Chicago, O'Grady even trailed Harold Washington Party nominee Tommy Brewer, who was considered a political unknown.

State's Attorney (special election) 

In the 1990 Cook County State's Attorney special election, incumbent state's attorney Cecil A. Partee, a Democrat appointed in 1989 after Richard M. Daley resigned to serve as mayor of Chicago, lost reelection to Republican Jack O'Malley.

This is the last time that a non-incumbent Republican has won election to a Cook County executive office.

Primaries

Democratic

Republican

General election

Superintendent of Education Service Region 

In the 1990 Cook County Superintendent of Education Service Region election, incumbent fourth-term superintendent Richard J. Martwick, a Democrat, was reelected.

This was the last election before the position was eliminated.

Primaries

Democratic

Republican

General election

Treasurer 

In the 1990 Cook County Treasurer election, incumbent fourth-term treasurer Edward J. Rosewell, a Democrat, was reelected.

Primaries

Democratic

Republican

General election

President of the Cook County Board of Commissioners 

In the 1990 President of the Cook County Board of Commissioners election, incumbent president George Dunne, a Democrat that had held the office since 1969, did not seek reelection. Democrat Richard Phelan was elected to succeed him.

Primaries

Democratic
Richard Phelan, a millionaire attorney from Winnetka, won the Democratic primary. He had entered the race as a political unknown. Phelan did not have a strong political organization, but ran an multimillion-dollar campaign with heavy investment in television advertising. He defeated former Illinois Appellate judge R. Eugene Pincham, Cook County clerk Stanley Kusper, and state senator Ted Lechowicz. Phelan ran on a message of change, running against the county Democratic Party establishment.

Originally, Kusper had been the race's frontrunner, but by election day, had been relegated to an also-ran. Lechowicz had been endorsed by the Cook County Democratic Party.

Republican

General election

Cook County Board of Commissioners 

The 1990 Cook County Board of Commissioners election saw all seventeen seats of the Cook County Board of Commissioners up for election to four-year terms in two sets of elections (ten elected from an election held in the city of Chicago and seven elected from an election held in suburban Cook County).

Democrats increased their majority by a single seat.

This was the last election for the Cook County Board of Commissioners done this way, as the board would switch to districts for its 1994 election.

City of Chicago
Ten seats were elected from the City of Chicago.

Primaries

Democratic

Republican

General election
Before the general election, Democratic nominee R. Eugene Pincham left to run on the Harold Washington Party slate, and was replaced on the Democratic slate by Danny K. Davis. Republican nominee Percy V. Coleman also switched from their slate to the Harold Washington Party slate.

Suburban Cook County

Primaries

Democratic

Republican

General election
Republican nominee Harold L. Tyrell was replaced on the ballot by Angelo Saviano.

Cook County Board of Appeals 

In the 1990 Cook County Board of Appeals election, both seats on the board were up for election. The election was an at-large election.

Primaries

Democratic

Republican

General election

Water Reclamation District Board 

In the 1990 Metropolitan Water Reclamation District of Greater Chicago election, three of the nine seats on the Metropolitan Water Reclamation District of Greater Chicago board were up for election in an at-large election. All three Democratic nominees won.

Judicial elections
Partisan elections were held for judgeships on the Circuit Court of Cook County, due to vacancies. Other judgeships had retention elections.

Ballot questions 
Two ballot questions were included on ballots county-wide during the November general election.

Establish Financial Consumer Association

Single Membered Districts

Other elections
Coinciding with the primaries, elections were held to elect both the Democratic and Republican committeemen for the suburban townships.

See also 
 1990 Illinois elections

References 

Cook County
Cook County, Illinois elections
Cook County 1990
Cook County
Cook County, Illinois elections